Humani may refer to :


Law
Hostis humani generis, a legal term of art that originates in admiralty law

Organizations
Humani (organisation) or the Humanist Association of Northern Ireland, a humanist organisation based in Northern Ireland

Religion
Humani generis, a papal encyclical that Pope Pius XII promulgated on 12 August 1950
Humani generis redemptionem, an encyclical by Pope Benedict XV on Rome 15 June 1917
Humani generis unitas, a planned encyclical of Pope Pius XI before his death on 10 February 1939

Science
De Incendiis Corporis Humani Spontaneis, a book published by French author Jonas Dupont
De humani corporis fabrica, a textbook of human anatomy written by Andreas Vesalius (1514–1564)

See also
Humani generis (disambiguation)